Randiellidae is a family of annelids belonging to the order Enchytraeida.

Genera:
 Randiella Erséus & Strehlow, 1986

References

Annelids